Kure may refer to:

Places
Kure, Hiroshima (呉), a city in Hiroshima prefecture, Japan
Kure Line, a rail line in the city
Kure Naval Base
Kure Station, a railway station on the Kure Line
Kure Atoll, an island in the Pacific Ocean, part of Hawaii
Kure Beach, North Carolina, a town near Wilmington and part of its metropolitan area

Küre, Kastamonu, a town and district of Kastamonu Province, Turkey
Küre Mountain, a mountain at Bartın and Kastamonu provinces
Küre Brook, a small river near İnebolu, Kastamonu Province
Küre, Bilecik, a town in Söğüt district of Bilecik Province, Turkey
Küre Mountains, a mountain range in Turkey

People
Inge Kure (born 1965), Dutch cricket player
Urve Kure (born 1931), Estonian chess player
, Japanese manga artist and illustrator

Organizations
KURE, a radio station (88.5 FM) licensed to serve Ames, Iowa, United States
KURE-LP, a low-power radio station (106.1 FM) licensed to serve Eloy, Arizona, United States
Kure Software Koubou, Japanese video game development company

See also

Cure (disambiguation)

Japanese-language surnames